The Route des Grands Crus (roughly, "road of the great wines") is the name of a tourist route situated in Burgundy, France.

The approximately 60-kilometre route runs along the foot of the Côte d'Or escarpment, from Dijon in the north to Santenay in the south. Thus it runs through many of the great appellations of Burgundy wine, hence the name of the route. It takes the visitor through the vineyards of the Côte de Nuits and the Côte de Beaune and the back hills (Hautes-Côtes) behind and above the wine slopes.

It is punctuated by 33 villages or little towns, including Beaune, many of which have picturesque churches.

Route
 
From north to south:
 Marsannay-la-Côte
 Côte de Nuits
 Fixin
 Gevrey-Chambertin
 Morey-Saint-Denis
 Chambolle-Musigny
 Vougeot
 Flagey-Echézeaux
 Vosne-Romanée
 Nuits-Saint-Georges
 Côte de Beaune
 Aloxe-Corton
 Savigny-Lès-Beaune
 Beaune
 Pommard
 Volnay

 Meursault

See also
French wine
Burgundy wine
Côte de Nuits
Saisy

References

Further reading
 
  An inexpensive introduction to the Côte d'Or and currently the most up to date book.

External links
 Description
 thewinedoctor.com  An overview of the geography and wines of Burgundy
 The Burgundy Report Good descriptions of the vineyards and vintages.

Tourist attractions in Côte-d'Or
Burgundy wine
Wine regions of France